Pomaderris tropica is a species of flowering plant in the family Rhamnaceae and is endemic to Walshs Pyramid in north Queesland. It is a shrub with softly-hairy branchlets, egg-shaped to elliptic leaves and clusters of white to cream-coloured flowers.

Description
The upper surface of the leaves is covered with velvety hairs and the lower surface densely covered with soft, star-shaped hairs. Flowering occurs from August to November.

Taxonomy
Pomaderris tropica was first formally described in 1951 by Norman Arthur Wakefield in The Victorian Naturalist from specimens collected by Hugo Flecker on Walshs Pyramid in 1938. The specific epithet (tropica) means "tropical".

Distribution and habitat
This pomaderris grows in narrow crevices between rocks on Walshs Pyramid in north Queensland.

Conservation status
Pomaderris tropica is classified as of "least concern" under the Queensland Government Nature Conservation Act 1992.

References

Flora of Queensland
tropica
Plants described in 1951
Taxa named by Norman Arthur Wakefield